Raikiri may refer to:

A sword wielded by Sengoku Period samurai:
Tachibana Dōsetsu (1513–1585)
Tachibana Ginchiyo (1569–1602)
A ninjutsu technique used by Kakashi Hatake in the manga and anime series Naruto
A sword technique used in the light novel/anime series Chivalry of a Failed Knight

See also
Goat Island/Rakiriri, an island in Otago Harbour, South Island, New Zealand